Black Light District (2002) is an EP by the Dutch rock band The Gathering. It was first made available as an internet-only release on 24 June 2002 and officially went in distribution on 16 September 2002. The EP marks a 12½-year anniversary of the band, and also the end of their five-album contract with Century Media Records. Black Light District was released under The Gathering's own label Psychonaut Records, and it is the label's first completely new release, however, since EP does not qualify as an album, the later released Souvenirs is widely regarded as the very first brand new album release of the label.

Track listing 

Spoken parts on "Black Light District" are performed by Sarah Jezebel Deva.

The CD also contains a hidden track which, according to the band, is titled "Over You", and a multimedia part featuring an extensive video of the band working on the mini-album and tracks from their following full-length album Souvenirs.

Personnel 
 Anneke van Giersbergen – vocals
 René Rutten – guitars
 Frank Boeijen – synthesizer, keyboards
 Hugo Prinsen Geerligs – bass
 Hans Rutten – drums

References 

The Gathering (band) albums
2002 EPs